Lunney is an Irish surname. It is an anglicisation of the unrelated O’Luinin of Fermanagh, the O'Luinigh of Tyrone and O'Luanaigh.

List of people with the surname 

 Barry Lunney Jr. (born 1974), American football coach
 Bryan Lunney (born 1966), American aerospace engineer and former NASA flight director.
 Glynn Lunney (1936–2021), American NASA engineer
 James Lunney (born 1951), Canadian politician
 Kevin Lunney, Irish kidnapping victim

References

See also 
 Luney
 Lunney v. Prodigy Services Co.
 Linney

Surnames
Anglicised Irish-language surnames
Surnames of British Isles origin